Čajlane is a village in the municipality of Saraj, North Macedonia.

Demographics
According to the 1467-68 Ottoman defter, Čajlane appears as being inhabited by an Orthodox Albanian population. Some families had a mixed Slav-Albanian anthroponomy - usually a Slavic first name and an Albanian last name or last names with Albanian patronyms and Slavic suffixes. 

The names are: Gjini star (old man), Nikola the son of Gjin, Gjurko the son of Gjin, Nikola the son of Dan-ko, Dimitri his brother, Rada the son of Dral, Radoslav the son of Sotir, Dan-ço son of Vlad, Gjurja his brother, Stanisha son of Dopsi, Gjuro his brother.  

According to the 2021 census, the village had a total of 639 inhabitants. Ethnic groups in the village include:

Albanians 602
Others 37

References

External links

Villages in Saraj Municipality
Albanian communities in North Macedonia